Roswitha Trexler (born 23 November 1936) is a German operatic soprano and mezzo-soprano who became internationally known especially as an interpreter of the music of  Hans Eisler and for her commitment to avantgarde vocal music.

Life and career 
Trexler was born in 1936 in Leipzig as the daughter of the composer, cantor and professor of catholic church music Georg Trexler. She attended the Thomasschule there and made her debut in 1956 at a festival week with medieval church music. From 1957 she appeared at the Bach performances in Leipzig's Thomaskirche under Thomaskantor Kurt Thomas. For several years she belonged to the MDR Rundfunkchor under Herbert Kegel and was active in special ensembles for early music (Capella lipsiensis, Capella fidicina).

In the following years she worked with Hans Werner Henze, Luigi Nono, Witold Lutosławski, Milko Kelemen and Frederic Rzewski on concerts and radio recordings. She also worked for the premiere of works by Reiner Bredemeyer, Paul Dessau, Edison Denisov, Paul-Heinz Dittrich, Georg Katzer, Hermann Keller, Luca Lombardi, Robert Moran and Friedrich Schenker. One focus of her work was on Hanns Eisler: within the framework of the record edition of the GDR label Nova she was entrusted with the complete recording of his Lieder mit Klavier and the Kantaten aus dem Exil, and in 1982 she premiered his full-length . As Schönberg interpreter she appeared under Kurt Masur with the Pierrot Lunaire and played with John Tilbury (piano) for the label Eterna the song cycle Das Buch der hängenenden Gärten. A side branch of her repertoire was the chanson/song; she has also reflected theoretically on her Kurt Weill interpretations. Her international career started in 1971 at the festival Steirischer Herbst and led her to focal points of New Music like the Warsaw Autumn, the Buffalo-Festival, the Cantiere Internazionale d'Arte Montepulciano, the Centre Georges-Pompidou in Paris and the Musikbiennale in Zagreb.

Discography 
 Porträtplatte mit Werken von Paul Dessau, Hanns Eisler, Witold Lutosławski (Wergo, 1975)
 Hanns Eisler: Kantaten aus dem Exil (Nova, 1977)
 Hanns Eisler: Aus dem Hollywooder Liederbuch (Nova, 1978)
 Arnold Schönberg: Das Buch der hängenden Gärten / Alban Berg: Sieben frühe Lieder (Eterna, 1979)
 Paul Dessau: Lieder und Gesänge (Nova,1981)
 Hanns Eisler: Lieder aus dem Exil (Nova 1981)
 Hanns Eisler: Frühe Lieder (Nova, 1983)
 Heiter-satirische Verse (works by Rainer Kunad, Christfried Schmidt, Friedrich Schenker, Hans Jürgen Wenzel) (Nova, 1984)
 Kurt Schwaen: Lieder (Nova, 1984)
 Luca Lombardi: Tui-Gesänge (Eterna, 1985)
 Anton Webern: Lieder (Eterna, 1987)
 Rudolf Wagner-Régeny: Lieder (Nova, 1989)
 Individual contributions, also participation in ensemble pieces, on numerous other records

TV films 
 Klaus Ager: La Règle du Jeu (ZDF, 1979)
 Versuche über Roswitha – Roswitha Trexler und die neue Musik (Deutscher Fernsehfunk, 1981)
 Brecht in den Zwanzigern: Brecht als Komponist (Radiotelevisione della Svizzera Italiana, 1983)
 Ich will singend sagen, wie ich die Welt sehe – Porträt von Roswitha Trexler (director Gitta Nickel, 1985)

Awards and distinctions 
 1974 Kunstpreis der Stadt Leipzig.
 1975 Kunstpreis der DDR.
 1979 Ehrennadel des Verbandes der Komponisten und Musikwissenschaftler.
 1984 Stern der Völkerfreundschaft in Silber.

Further reading 
 Verunsicherung mit Gewinn. Die Sopranistin Roswitha Trexler im Exklusiv-Gespräch über Hanns Eisler. In Notate 5 (1982), Nr. 5, .
 Cornelia Rost: Freundlich in finstren Zeiten. Ein Gespräch mit der Sängerin Roswitha Trexler. In Neue Zeitschrift für Musik 146 (1985), .
 Fritz Hennenberg: Gesang & Gesichter. Roswitha Trexler in Begegnungen mit Musikern und Musik. Henschel Verlag, Berlin 1990, .
 Fritz Hennenberg: In meiner lieben Vaterstadt... Porträt der Sängerin Roswitha Trexler. In Leipziger Blätter 17 (1990), .
 Roswitha Trexler. In Horst Riedel Leipzig-Lexikon von A bis Z. 2., revised and extended edition, PRO Leipzig, Leipzig 2012, .
 Peter Deeg: Dann haben Sie sicher auch schon den Pierrot gesungen. Ein Gespräch mit Roswitha Trexler. In Eisler-Mitteilungen 22 (2015), n° 59, .
 Fritz Hennenberg: Roswitha Trexlers Eisler-Schallplatten bei Wergo und Nova. In Eisler-Mitteilungen 22 (2015), Nr. 59, .

References

External links 
 

German operatic sopranos
German operatic mezzo-sopranos
1936 births
Living people
Musicians from Leipzig